Lay It Down is a 2001 Christian action film directed by Michael Cargile. It was released on April 3, 2001.

Plot 
The two Destin brothers are about to collide with eternity. When older Ben (Sean McEwen) chooses the narrow road, he forces his younger brother Pete, and the people around him, into a head-on encounter with life and death.

Cast 
Sean McEwen as Ben Destin
Nathan Bell as Pete Destin
Jacob Head as Nicky 'D'
Francesca Caro as Mrs. Destin

Awards 
2002 Crown Awards
Gold Crown Award for Best Youth Film
Silver Crown Award for Best Drama Under $250,000

References

External links 
 
 Lay it Down review by The Dove Foundation

2001 action films
Films about evangelicalism
American action films
American auto racing films
American drama films
Films produced by Kevin Downes
2000s English-language films
2000s American films